Tarheel is an unincorporated community in western Gates County, North Carolina. It is on the junction of U.S. Route 13, and U.S. Route 158, at an elevation of 39 feet (12 m).

References

Unincorporated communities in North Carolina
Unincorporated communities in Gates County, North Carolina